Arthur Lismer,  LL. D. (27 June 1885 – 23 March 1969) was an English-Canadian painter, member of the Group of Seven and educator. He is known primarily as a landscape painter and for his paintings of ships in dazzle camouflage.

Early life
Lismer was born in Sheffield, Yorkshire, England, the son of Harriet and Edward Lismer, a draper's buyer. At age thirteen, he apprenticed at a photo-engraving company. He was awarded a scholarship, and used this time to take evening classes at the Sheffield School of Art from 1898 until 1905. In 1905, he moved to Antwerp, Belgium, where he studied art at the Academie Royale.

Lismer immigrated to Canada in 1911, settled in Toronto, Ontario, and took a job with Grip Ltd.

Lismer's brother, Ted, remained in Sheffield and became a notable trade unionist and communist activist.

President of NSCAD University
From 1916 to 1919 Lismer served as the President of the Victoria College of Art in Nova Scotia (now NSCAD University).

Official war artist

In wartime Halifax, Lismer was inspired by the shipping and naval activity of the port, notably the dramatically painted dazzle camouflaged ships with their patterns of curved and zigzag lines designed to mislead
German U-boats and submarines. Lismer's work came to the attention of Lord Beaverbrook who arranged for Lismer to be commissioned as an official war artist. His best-known work from the war years depicted what he observed and learned about in Halifax, Nova Scotia: Mine sweeping, convoying, patrolling and harbor defense. Lismer completed a number of oil studies and finished several major canvases during 1918 and 1919. These included the large and ebullient Convoy in Bedford Basin (c.1919), which depicts merchant ships forming a transatlantic convoy near Halifax. He also did some sketches of the Halifax Explosion.

During his time as a war artist, he wrote a booklet for the Canadian Armed Services titled How to get started: Watercolor Painting for Pleasure.

Group of Seven
 
The collaboration of four artists at Grip gradually evolved into the Group of Seven, whose work was intended to contribute to the process of giving Canada a distinctive national voice in painting. He also worked with the cadre at Grip.

Arthur Lismer's style was influenced by his pre-Canadian experience (primarily in Antwerp), where he found the Barbizon and post-impressionist movements a key inspiration. Collaborating with the group of artists who would, in 1920, become the Group of Seven, Lismer exhibited the characteristic post-impressionist style, and spiritual connection with the landscape that would embody that group's work. Like the other members of the Group of Seven many of his works began as small en plein air sketches in oil on hardboard.

During the Centennial of the City of Toronto, in 1934, Lismer was on the Pictures Committee. His work in art education was effective; and this service to the wider community caused Lismer to become influential in ways not always achieved by his artist colleagues. For example, he started a children's art program at the Art Gallery of Toronto, which became successful in the 1930s. In 1936, as Lismer's prominence in the field of art education involved him in international travels, he went on a one-year tour of South Africa. Together with art educator Norah McCullough, he organized art education programmes, lectured on Canadian art and gave workshops for teachers. On the trip, he painted extensively in watercolour.

He moved to Montreal in 1940, as a result of being given a teaching appointment at the  Art Association of Montreal and established the MMFA School of Art and Design. He joined the McGill School of Architecture as a sessional lecturer in 1943 at the invitation of John Bland, the School’s director, and was appointed assistant professor in 1945, retiring in 1955 at the age of seventy.

Between 1940 and 1950, he travelled in the summertime to the east coast of Canada to paint. He particularly liked to paint fishermen`s gear on the docks of Cape Breton Island, Nova Scotia.

In 1951, a retrospective exhibition of Lismer's work, originating at the Art Gallery of Toronto, traveled in an abbreviated version to the Art Gallery of Greater Victoria, the Vancouver Art Gallery and the University of British Columbia Fine Arts Gallery and may have influenced him to take his first trip to the West Coast in the summer of that year. Using Galiano Island as a base, he explored Pender and Saltspring Islands, as well as Victoria and Long Beach on Vancouver Island.

Several members of the Group of Seven including Lismer became members of the Canadian Group of Painters in 1933. In 1962, he received the Canada Council Medal for his contribution to Canadian art. In 1967, he was made a Companion of the Order of Canada.

Lismer died on March 23, 1969, in Montreal, Quebec, and was buried alongside other members of the original Seven at the McMichael Canadian Art Collection Grounds.

Legacy
In Toronto, Lismer Hall, the auditorium at Humberside Collegiate Institute is named in his honour. He painted one of the largest murals in Canada for the school during the 1930s that hangs on the auditorium's walls today.

Lismer has been designated as an Historic Person in the Directory of Federal Heritage Designations.

See also
 Canadian official war artists
 War artist
 War art

References

Notes

Citations

Bibliography 
 
 Brandon, Laura. (2008). Art and War. New York: I.B. Tauris. ; OCLC 225345535
Brandon, Laura. (2021). War Art in Canada: A Critical History. Toronto: Art Canada Institute, 2021. ISBN 978-1-4871-0271-5.
 Darroch, Lois. (1981). Bright Land: a Warm Look at Arthur Lismer. Toronto: Merritt. ; OCLC 421844431
 Gallatin, Albert Eugene. (1919). Art and the Great War. New York: E.P. Dutton. OCLC 422817
 Grigor, Angela Nairne. (2002). Arthur Lismer, Visionary Art Educator. Montréal : McGill-Queen's University Press, 2002. ; OCLC 500964462
 Reid, Dennis R. (1988). A Concise History of Canadian Painting. Toronto: Oxford University Press. ; ; OCLC 18378555

External links

Lismer, a NFB documentary
Arthur Lismer, Lethbridge College Buchanan Art Collection
Gallery of Lismer's works
"Arthur Lismer: Painter and Educator", Harvard Square Library

1885 births
1969 deaths
20th-century English painters
Artists from Sheffield
Camoufleurs
Canadian war artists
Companions of the Order of Canada
English male painters
English Unitarians
Group of Seven (artists)
Members of the Royal Canadian Academy of Arts
NSCAD University people
Persons of National Historic Significance (Canada)
Royal Academy of Fine Arts (Antwerp) alumni
World War I artists
Canadian art educators
Canadian landscape painters
Canadian Impressionist painters
20th-century English male artists
Canadian muralists